Shen Wai International School (SWIS) is an international school in Nanshan District, Shenzhen, China. Its students are children of foreign expatriate workers and people with residency in Hong Kong and Macau as well as the current Republic of China (Taiwan) jurisdiction of Taiwan, the Pescadores, and Kinmen and Matsu. It is the international section of the Shenzhen Foreign Languages School.

SWIS is an authorized International Baccalaureate (IB) school for students aged 4–18: Primary Years Programme (PYP), Middle Years Programme (MYP) and Diploma Programme (DP). It is authorized by the Council of International Schools (CIS). and Western Association of Schools and Colleges (WASC)

References

External links 
 Shen Wai International School
 Mathematics Challenge SIMOC
 SZNews - literacy month
 SWIS - HAN's Makerspace

Nanshan District, Shenzhen
International schools in Shenzhen